The Waianakarua River is a river in North Otago, New Zealand, flowing into the Pacific Ocean. It is crossed by Highway 1 at Waianakarua, south of Herbert, by an old historic bridge.
The river has a catchment size of approximately 260 km2.

The tiver has three main branches, simply known as the South, Middle, and North branches. All three branches flow from the slopes of the Horse Range. The South and Middle branches have their source in the hills between Morrisons and Dunback. The North branch rises in several small streams close to Morrisons, the longest of which is called Waddells Creek, which rises 10 km north of Morrisons close to the southern end of the Kakanui Range.

A notable archaeological site, a pre-European moa-hunter settlement, exists at Tai Rua, just north of the river's mouth.

See also
List of rivers of New Zealand

References

Rivers of Otago
Rivers of New Zealand